Thomas Walther Rachel (born 17 May 1962) is a German politician of the Christian Democratic Union (CDU) who has been serving as a member of the Bundestag from the state of North Rhine-Westphalia since 1994. From 2005 until 2021, he also served as Parliamentary State Secretary at the Federal Ministry of Education and Research in the government of Chancellor Angela Merkel.

He has represented the Düren (electoral district) since 2005.

Early career 
From 1986 until 1987, Rachel worked as parliamentary assistant to Matthias Wissmann.

Political career 
Rachel first became a member of the Bundestag in the 1994 German federal election. From 1994 until 2005, he served on the Committee for Education, Research and Technology Assessment. In addition to his committee assignments, he also served as deputy chaiman of the German-Greek Parliamentary Friendship Group from 1997 until 2005.

Since 2003, Rachel has been chairing the Evangelical Working Group of the CDU/CSU (EAK).

From the 2005 elections until 2021, Rachel served as Parliamentary State Secretary at the Federal Ministry of Education and Research in the government of Chancellor Angela Merkel, under the leadership of successive ministers Annette Schavan (2005–2013, Johanna Wanka (2013–2018) and Anja Karliczek (2018–2021).

In the negotiations to form a "grand coalition" of Chancellor Angela Merkel's Christian Democrats (CDU together with the Bavarian CSU) and the Social Democrats (SPD) following the 2013 federal elections, Rachel was part of the CDU/CSU delegation in the working group on education and research policy. In similar negotiations following the 2017 federal elections, he was again part of the working group on education policy.

Since 2021, Rachel has been serving on the Committee on Economic Cooperation and Development.

Other activities 
 German Institute for Development Evaluation (DEval), Member of the Advisory Board (since 2022)
 Leo Baeck Foundation, Member of the Board of Trustees (since 2022)
 Evangelical Church in Germany (EKD), Member of the council (since 2015)
 Deutsche Welle, Member of the Broadcasting Council (2006–2008)

Political positions 
In June 2017, Rachel voted against Germany's introduction of same-sex marriage.

In 2019, Rachel joined 14 members of his parliamentary group who, in an open letter, called for the party to rally around Merkel and party chairwoman Annegret Kramp-Karrenbauer amid criticism voiced by conservatives Friedrich Merz and Roland Koch.

References

External links 

  
 Bundestag biography 

1962 births
Living people
Members of the Bundestag 1994–1998
Members of the Bundestag 1998–2002
Members of the Bundestag 2002–2005
Members of the Bundestag 2005–2009
Members of the Bundestag 2009–2013
Members of the Bundestag 2013–2017
Members of the Bundestag 2017–2021
Members of the Bundestag 2021–2025
Members of the Bundestag for North Rhine-Westphalia
Parliamentary State Secretaries of Germany
Members of the Bundestag for the Christian Democratic Union of Germany